Jesús Aizpún Tuero (17 June 1928 – 29 December 1999) was a Spanish politician from the Navarrese People's Union. He served as member of the first five legislatures of the Congress of Deputies. He served also as member of the Navarrese Parliament.

References

1928 births
1999 deaths
People from Pamplona
Members of the 1st Congress of Deputies (Spain)
Members of the 2nd Congress of Deputies (Spain)
Members of the 3rd Congress of Deputies (Spain)
Members of the 4th Congress of Deputies (Spain)
Members of the 5th Congress of Deputies (Spain)
Navarrese People's Union politicians
Politicians from Navarre